KPCE-LD is a low-power television station in Tucson, Arizona, owned and operated by Word of God Fellowship, the business entity for the Daystar Television Network. It operates in digital on UHF channel 29 with its transmitter in the Tucson Mountains, west of downtown Tucson.

History
An original construction permit for low-power television station K29CO, channel 29, was granted to Hispanic Broadcasters of Arizona, Inc. on October 2, 1997. It was to be a Spanish-language station, rebroadcasting Tucson-area station K14HR (now KUDF-LP) from the Santa Rita Mountains near Green Valley, its community of license. In November 2000, before the station signed on, Hispanic Broadcasters sold the permit to Good News Radio Broadcasting, Inc. of Green Valley (later Good Music, Inc.), owners of six radio stations in Tucson and Douglas. Good News Radio Broadcasting immediately changed the station's callsign to KPCE-LP and licensed the station three months later, on February 16, 2001, as a Daystar Television Network affiliate. After a few years of operation, the station went silent and in September 2005, Word of God Fellowship, Inc. acquired the license from Good Music, returning the station to air in May 2006.  In June 2005, the FCC granted KPCE-LP a permit to construct new facilities at the antenna farm in the Tucson Mountains and to change their city of license to Tucson. The station completed construction and began broadcasting in June 2008, giving KPCE-LP much greater coverage in the Tucson metropolitan area.

KPCE-LP stopped broadcasting in analog on July 13, 2021 due to the FCC's expiration of the LPTV digital deadline. A construction permit for KCPE-LP Digital was granted by the FCC and return to air date is unknown. The station was licensed for digital operation on October 15, 2021, changing its call sign to KPCE-LD.

References

External links
 Daystar Television Network
 

PCE-LD
Daystar (TV network) affiliates
Television channels and stations established in 2001
2001 establishments in Arizona
Low-power television stations in the United States